Paulasterias is a genus of sea stars within the monotypic family Paulasteriidae.

References 

Forcipulatacea
Asteroidea genera